Michael Maximino C. Elgar (born May 8, 1976) is a Filipino musician currently performing as a guitarist and one of the lead vocalists for the band Rivermaya. He has been the band's longest serving guitarist, ever since he joined in May 2001.

Music career
At the age of 10, he learned to play guitar. When he was 13 years old, he already formed a band and played his first gig and in 1992 (15 years old), he is already a national guitar champion.

In 1999, he signed as a recording artist in the Jett Pangan Group and produce 1 Extended Play and 1 album before it was dissolved in 2001.

In 2000, he formed the band 7 Foot Junior as its frontman and guitarist.

He was later recruited by Rivermaya in May 2001 with Japs Sergio (from Daydream Cycle) and Kakoy Legaspi (from Mr. Crayon) after the departure of the original bassist Nathan Azarcon and session/touring guitarist J-John Valencia (who left by Summer of 2001).

He has since then played with the band as lead guitarist and eventually became one of the lead vocalists of the band. He is also one of the songwriters in the band.

Personal life
Elgar is a communications graduate of the Ateneo de Manila University.

Discography
Rivermaya
 Tuloy ang Ligaya (2001)
 Between the Stars and Waves (2003)
 You'll Be Safe Here (EP) (2005)
 Isang Ugat, Isang Dugo (2006)
 Bagong Liwanag (EP) (2007)
 Buhay (2008)
 Closest Thing to Heaven (2009)
 Panatang Makabanda (2013)
 Sa Kabila ng Lahat (2017)

References

1976 births
Living people
Musicians from Manila
Ateneo de Manila University alumni
Rivermaya members
Lead guitarists